In mathematics, a universal quadratic form is a quadratic form over a ring that represents every element of the ring.  A non-singular form over a field which represents zero non-trivially is universal.

Examples
 Over the real numbers, the form x2 in one variable is not universal, as it cannot represent negative numbers: the two-variable form  over R is universal.
 Lagrange's four-square theorem states that every positive integer is the sum of four squares.  Hence the form  over Z  is universal.
 Over a finite field, any non-singular quadratic form of dimension 2 or more is universal.

Forms over the rational numbers
The Hasse–Minkowski theorem implies that a form is universal over Q if and only if it is universal over Qp for all p (where we include , letting Q∞ denote R).  A form over R is universal if and only if it is not definite; a form over Qp is universal if it has dimension at least 4.  One can conclude that all indefinite forms of dimension at least 4 over Q are universal.

See also
 The 15 and 290 theorems give conditions for a quadratic form to represent all positive integers.

References

 
 
 

Field (mathematics)
Quadratic forms